Drilon Ibrahimi (born 2 January 1988) is a Kosovan sports shooter. He competed in the men's 10 metre air rifle event at the 2020 Summer Olympics. He also competed in the men's 10 metre air rifle event at the 2022 Mediterranean Games held in Oran, Algeria.

References

External links
 

1988 births
Living people
Kosovan male sport shooters
Olympic shooters of Kosovo
Shooters at the 2020 Summer Olympics
Competitors at the 2022 Mediterranean Games
Mediterranean Games competitors for Kosovo
Place of birth missing (living people)